The Tunjang railway station is a Malaysian train station located at and named after the town of Tunjang. It closed and demolished in 2010 for giving way to the construction Ipoh–Padang Besar electrified and double-tracking project.

Defunct railway stations in Malaysia